Kajla is a breed of sheep, native to Punjab, Pakistan. It is mainly bred in Sargodha and other cities such as Gujranwala, Lahore, Faisalabad, apart from being found in some parts of India. The breed is bred primarily for its wool, meat and milk. This breed can grow significantly large and bulky at a young age.

References

Livestock in Punjab
Sheep breeds
Sheep breeds originating in Pakistan